The NASCAR Rookie of the Year Award is presented to the first-year driver that has the best season in a NASCAR season. Each of NASCAR's national and regional touring series selects a RotY winner each year.

History of the Award
The Rookie of the Year award for NASCAR's premier series was first presented to a driver named Blackie Pitt by Houston Lawing, NASCAR's Public Relations director, in 1954. While it wasn't an official award, it would help set the standard for the top rookie prize.  An official award started with the 1958 season.

From the 1958 through the 1973 seasons, NASCAR did not have an official points system to determine the Rookie of the Year, so NASCAR's officials merely gathered together to select a winner.  Some years were straight forward, such as James Hylton's selection in 1966, when he finished second in the overall championship, the highest ever finish for an eligible rookie.  In other years, the system came under controversy, as officials didn't consider former champions from rival racing series and there were no transparent and consistent criteria for selecting the winner. Since 1974, the Rookie of the Year points system described below has been used, even if it meant the winner was not the highest finisher in championship points.

As of the 2018 season, the rookie of the Year points are the same as the championship points.

The award is currently sponsored by Sunoco. Drivers competing for the award must display the Sunoco contingency decal.

Eligibility
Drivers must meet the following criteria in order to be eligible to run for or receive the Rookie of the Year award.

Must have run no more than five (prior to 2001) or seven (2001-present), and have been declared to race for driver points in that series (2011–present), races in any previous season.
Drivers who compete in more than five races in a higher NASCAR-sanctioned series are not eligible for the award in a lower series if they have not declared for the higher series.
Since the 2011 series declaration rule and NASCAR's tightening of driver health standards, NASCAR will often allow a lower-tier series driver pushed into the Cup Series as a reserve driver may run up to a half season, 18 races, without losing eligibility.  Furthermore, drivers who have been injury replacement are not punished for being a reserve driver.
In the Truck Series, must be 18 years of age or older by the start of the first playoff race.
A Truck Series driver who is 16 or 17 as of the first playoff race may participate in all eligible races without losing rookie eligibility. 
Truck Series drivers who turn 18 before the first playoff race may participate in up to ten races without losing rookie eligibility (with age-eligible race restrictions in place).
A driver who turns 18 after the first playoff race will be declared a 17-year old driver for purposes of rookie eligibility.
Talladega contains unique restrictions because of pack racing and being the fastest circuit on the series.  NASCAR will not allow a driver to participate at Daytona or Talladega without having participated in an intermediate track and passed proficiency standards because of safety issues.  Special rules are in effect at Talladega because drivers who turn 18 after the Daytona race but before the Talladega.
If a driver who is 18 at the first race of the season does not start eight races before the end of Race 20 on the schedule, they will immediately become ineligible to earn rookie points for the rest of that season and starting in 2011, remained declared for that series. Drivers may change series declaration in order to avoid this.  (Again, the rule does not apply to drivers who are 16 or 17 at the start of the season in the Truck Series.)
A driver may not receive rookie points if they start a race for a team that they did not qualify with. However, they are still eligible for championship points in that race.
A driver must be in good NASCAR standing at the end of the season.  The driver may not have been involved in incidents of moral turpitude. (As of 2016, NASCAR reserves their right to indefinitely suspend drivers involved in any off-track discriminatory behavior and/or criminal charge or conviction, as well for failing NASCAR's substance abuse policy.)

There have been a few cases before the 2011 rule change where aspiring Cup drivers have sacrificed their future eligibility to be Rookie of the Year candidates by driving part-time schedules including more than seven Cup races. For example, in 2009, Brad Keselowski ended up running 15 races, including a win at Talladega.  Two other famous drivers who did the same thing are Carl Edwards (13 Cup races in 2004), and Marcos Ambrose (11 races in 2008).  In the 2023 NASCAR Cup Series, both eligible drivers, Ty Gibbs (15 races, all as a substitute driver) and Noah Gragson (18 races, with six as a substitute driver) raced a sufficient number of races in 2022 as substitute drivers when Cup Series drivers were medically suspended, but NASCAR treated them as substitute drivers.

On the other hand, 2007 Rookie of the Year winner Juan Pablo Montoya was eligible even though he had previously been the 1999 Rookie of the Year in the CART series (which at the time was the top level of open wheel racing.)

The 2009 NASCAR Camping World Truck Series Rookie of the Year was Johnny Sauter, who was a veteran of both the Nationwide and Cup Series.  He had never run more than three Truck races in any previous season, and made no 2009 starts at all in either of the two higher-level series, hence he was eligible for the truck series' rookie award. The 2006 Busch Series ROTY runner-up John Andretti was a veteran of the Cup Series but had made only one prior Busch Series start, making him eligible for the award.

In 1992, Ricky Craven, the Busch Series Rookie of the Year, actually had run seven races when the limit was five in 1991.  However, Craven was only credited with two Busch-only starts, as the other five starts were in combination races with the Busch North Series (now ARCA East), which he was a full-time regular at the time.  Since he was a full-time regular in the North Series, he was declared a North Series driver, so he could enter the combination race in that series and not compromise his eligibility in the "South" series under combination rules (both series shared one rule book).

Beginning in 2011, drivers that are ineligible for points in one series cannot earn Rookie points in that series. For example, Trevor Bayne ran 18 races in 2011; however, due to him declaring to run for the Nationwide championship, Bayne was also ineligible to declare for ROTY in 2011. Bayne therefore retained the right to declare for Rookie eligibility at a later date.  However, when Bayne finally declared for Sprint Cup points in 2015, a previously little-known provision came into play that places a limit on the cumulative number of races a driver can run without declaring for points before he loses future Rookie eligibility.  Bayne was confirmed by NASCAR to have exceeded this limit (although there has yet to be a definite announcement on what this limit actually is) and is therefore ineligible to run for Rookie of the Year in 2015. Danica Patrick ran 10 races in 2012 in Sprint Cup, though she declared she would race for the Nationwide championship, allowing her in 2013 to declare in Sprint Cup, and race as a rookie.  This also allows lower-tier drivers to substitute for injured drivers in higher-tier series without risk of losing rookie eligibility.  Erik Jones did that in 2015 twice for four races (three starts) to replace Cup teammates who had fallen ill, been injured, or suspended.  Noah Gragson (18 races in 2022, five as a substitute driver) and Ty Gibbs (15 races in 2022, all as a substitute) are 2023 rookie candidates;  both drivers ran enough races as an injury replacement.

Furthermore, in 2013, NASCAR added rules where drivers 16 and 17 years of age may race in the Camping World Truck Series and not lose rookie eligibility because a driver can only race 10 of the 23 races on the schedule (tracks under 1.25 miles (2.01 km) or shorter and road courses).  In 2015, two rookie contenders in the series – Erik Jones and John Hunter Nemechek – were declared rookies though they had exceeded the seven-race limit because of age restrictions (Jones turned 18 in the middle of the 2014 season, and Nemechek turned 18 in the middle of the 2015 season). Cole Custer was declared a 2016 Truck Series rookie despite having raced two seasons because of age eligibility (turned 18 before the start of the 2016 season).  Starting in 2018, the restrictions were tightened, since one driver-eligible track, New Hampshire Motor Speedway (1.058 miles), was removed from the schedule in favour of a second race at a driver-ineligible track, Las Vegas Motor Speedway (1.5 miles).  In 2020, one new driver-eligible track, Richmond Raceway (0.750 miles), was added.

Currently, drivers under 18 can only compete at ten tracks in that series for 11 of the 23 races – Martinsville Speedway (0.526 miles), Bristol Motor Speedway (0.533 miles, both dirt and concrete races), Richmond Raceway (0.750 miles), Phoenix International Raceway (1.022 miles), World Wide Technology Raceway (1.25 miles), Circuit of the Americas (3.427 miles road course), Milwaukee Mile (1.015 miles), North Wilkesboro Speedway (0.625 miles), Mid-Ohio Sports Car Course (2.25 miles road course), and Lucas Oil Raceway at Indianapolis (0.686 miles).

Cup Series

2023 ROTY contenders
Ty Gibbs
Noah Gragson

History
Below is a list of all winners, and known runners-up. (Note: some of the drivers listed here are not confirmed as ROTY contenders, and competed in more than the maximum number of races to be eligible for ROTY honors.)

Xfinity Series

2023 ROTY Contenders
Parker Retzlaff
Sammy Smith 
Chandler Smith 
Connor Mosack

History

{| class="wikitable" style="font-size: 95%;"
|-
!Year
!Winner
!Runner(s) Up
|-
|2022
|Austin Hill
|Sheldon Creed, Kyle Sieg, Jesse Iwuji
|-
|2021
|Ty Gibbs
|Josh Berry, Jade Buford, Sam Mayer, Ryan Vargas, Jordan Anderson¶
|-
|2020
|Harrison Burton
|Riley Herbst, Myatt Snider, Jesse Little, Joe Graf Jr., Kody Vanderwal
|-
|2019
|Chase Briscoe
|John Hunter Nemechek, Noah Gragson, Justin Haley, Gray Gaulding, Brandon Brown, Zane Smith†, Ronnie Bassett Jr.†, Tyler Matthews†, Kyle Weatherman†, Bayley Currey¶, Harrison Burton¶, Riley Herbst¶
|-
|2018
|Tyler Reddick|Christopher Bell, Austin Cindric, Alex Labbe, Kaz Grala, Spencer Boyd, Vinnie Miller, Chad Finchum, Josh Bilicki, Matt Mills, Shane Lee†, Ty Majeski†, Josh Williams†
|-
|2017
|William Byron|Cole Custer, Daniel Hemric, Matt Tifft, Spencer Gallagher, Ben Kennedy, Tyler Reddick¶, Brandon Brown¶, Christopher Bell¶
|-
|2016
|Erik Jones
|Brennan Poole, Brandon Jones, Ryan Preece, Garrett Smithley, Ray Black Jr., B. J. McLeod, Cody Ware*, Corey LaJoie†, Martin Roy†, Todd Peck†, Matt Tifft¶, Spencer Gallagher¶ 
|-
|2015
|Daniel Suárez|Bubba Wallace, Ross Chastain, Cale Conley, Harrison Rhodes, Peyton Sellers, Josh Reaume, Ryan Blaney†, Ben Rhodes†, Mario Gosselin†, Dylan Lupton†, Derek White†, Jimmy Weller III†, Erik Jones¶, B. J. McLeod¶
|-
|2014
|Chase Elliott|Ty Dillon, Chris Buescher, Ryan Reed, Dylan Kwasniewski, Dakoda Armstrong, Ryan Sieg, Tanner Berryhill, Chad Boat, Tommy Joe Martins, Harrison Rhodes*, David Starr†, Carlos Contreras†, Ryan Ellis†, Ryan Blaney¶, Cale Conley¶
|-
|2013
|Kyle Larson
|Alex Bowman, Nelson Piquet Jr., Jeffrey Earnhardt, Kevin Swindell, Dexter Stacey, Hal Martin, Juan Carlos Blum, Ty Dillon¶
|-
|2012
|Austin Dillon|Cole Whitt, Jason Bowles, Brad Sweet, Johanna Long, Joey Gase, Casey Roderick, Benny Gordon, Jamie Dick†, Josh Richards†, Travis Pastrana†, Daryl Harr†, Tim Schendel†, Ryan Blaney¶
|-
|2011
|Timmy Hill
|Blake Koch, Ryan Truex, Jennifer Jo Cobb, Charles Lewandoski, Carl Long†, Tim Andrews†
|-
|2010
|Ricky Stenhouse Jr.|Brian Scott, Colin Braun, James Buescher, Parker Kligerman, Tayler Malsam†, Danica Patrick†
|-
|2009
|Justin Allgaier
|Brendan Gaughan, Michael Annett, Michael McDowell, Erik Darnell, Scott Lagasse Jr., John Wes Townley, Ken Butler III, Terry Cook, Peyton Sellers, Marc Davis*, Trevor Bayne†, Shelby Howard†, Matt Carter†, Kevin Conway†, Jeremy Clements†
|-
|2008
|Landon Cassill
|Bryan Clauson, Dario Franchitti, Cale Gale, Brian Keselowski, Chase Miller, Patrick Carpentier, Joey Logano†, Josh Wise†, Danny Efland†, Brandon Whitt†, Justin Hobgood†
|-
|2007
|David Ragan
|Marcos Ambrose, Brad Keselowski, Kyle Krisiloff, Brad Coleman, Juan Pablo Montoya, Robert Richardson Jr., Sam Hornish Jr., Justin Diercks*, Timothy Peters*, Bobby Santos III*, Alex García*, Brian Conz*, Kelly Bires†, Richard Johns†, Bobby East†, D. J. Kennington†, Brett Rowe†
|-
|2006
|Danny O'Quinn Jr.
|John Andretti, Todd Kluever, Burney Lamar, Mark McFarland, Stephen Leicht, David Gilliland, Tracy Hines, Joel Kauffman, A. J. Foyt IV*, Jorge Goeters*, Kevin Conway*, Chris Wimmer*, Auggie Vidovich II†, David Reutimann†, Steve Wallace†, Aric Almirola†, Shane Huffman†
|-
|2005
|Carl Edwards|Reed Sorenson, Denny Hamlin, Jon Wood, Brent Sherman, Kertus Davis, Michel Jourdain Jr., Tyler Walker, Ryan Hemphill, Brandon Miller, Paul Wolfe, Boston Reid*, A. J. Fike*, Blake Feese*, Kim Crosby*, Donnie Neuenberger*, Jerry Robertson†
|-
|2004
|Kyle Busch|Clint Bowyer, Paul Menard, J. J. Yeley, Billy Parker, Stan Boyd, Travis Geisler, Donnie Neuenberger*, Rick Markle*, Kevin Conway*, Brian Conz*, Aaron Fike†, Andy Ponstein†, Tina Gordon†
|-
|2003
|David Stremme
|Coy Gibbs, Joey Clanton, Chad Blount, Jason White, Chase Montgomery, Regan Smith, Damon Lusk, Chris Bingham, Martin Truex Jr.†, Tammy Jo Kirk†
|-
|2002
|Scott Riggs
|Johnny Sauter, Shane Hmiel, Kerry Earnhardt, Casey Mears, Brian Vickers, Kasey Kahne, Dan Pardus, Larry Gunselman†, Ron Young†, Brian Weber†, Joe Buford†
|-
|2001
|Greg Biffle|Scott Wimmer, Jamie McMurray, Larry Foyt, Tim Sauter, Marty Houston, David Donohue, Ryan Newman†, Kelly Denton†, Brad Baker†, Christian Elder†, Steadman Marlin†, Ken Alexander†, Bill Hoff†
|-
|2000
|Kevin Harvick|Ron Hornaday Jr., Jimmie Johnson, Jay Sauter, Michael Ritch*, P. J. Jones, Anthony Lazzaro, Mike Stefanik, Mike Borkowski, Derrick Gilchrist, Kelly Denton*, Jay Fogleman*, Dave Steele*
|-
|1999
|Tony Raines
|Hank Parker Jr., Adam Petty, Bobby Hamilton Jr., Tony Roper, Andy Kirby, Jimmy Kitchens, Ted Christopher*, Kelly Denton* Phillip Morris*, Kerry Earnhardt*, Skip Smith*
|-
|1998
|Andy Santerre
|Dave Blaney, Blaise Alexander, Kevin Grubb, Wayne Grubb, Casey Atwood, Mike Cope, Matt Hutter, Lance Hooper, Jason Jarrett, Kevin Schwantz, Brad Loney, Hank Parker Jr.*, Mike Stefanik*, Ashton Lewis Jr.†
|-
|1997
|Steve Park
|Matt Kenseth, Johnny Chapman, Mark Krogh, Jeff Krogh, Lyndon Amick, Chris Diamond, Jimmy Foster, Jeff McClure, Dale Earnhardt Jr., Tim Bender, Doug Reid III, Stanton Barrett, Tim Steele, David Hutto*, Tim Steele†, Scott Lagasse†, Dale Fischlein†
|-
|1996
|Glenn Allen Jr.
|Mike Dillon, Shane Hall, Mark Green, Tony Stewart, Mike Harmon, Jerry Nadeau*, Johnny Chapman*, Tim Bender*, Pete Orr*, Andy Hillenburg*, Jimmy Kitchens*, Greg Clark*, Mike Laughlin Jr.*, Elliott Sadler†, Ron Barfield Jr.†
|-
|1995
|Jeff Fuller
|Curtis Markham, Kirk Shelmerdine, L.W. Miller, David Bonnett, Greg Clark*, John Tanner*, Tim Bender*, Dale Williams*
|-
|1994
|Johnny Benson Jr.|Dennis Setzer, Kevin Lepage, Stevie Reeves, Randy Porter, Dirk Stephens, Johnny Rumley, Mike Garvey, Robbie Reiser, Chad Chaffin, Michael Ritch*, Kirk Shelmerdine*, Mike Stefanik*, George Crenshaw*, Jeff Neal*, Andy Hillenburg*
|-
|1993
|Hermie Sadler
|Joe Bessey, Tim Fedewa, Roy Payne, Nathan Buttke, Jason Keller, Michael Ritch*, Tom Hessert*, Alan Russell*, Ken Wallace*, Page Jones*
|-
|1992
|Ricky Craven^
|Shawna Robinson, Robert Huffman*, Randy MacDonald*, Greg Trammell*
|-
|1991
|Jeff Gordon
|David Green, Tracy Leslie, Troy Beebe, Cecil Eunice, Richard Lasater, Jeff Green, Mike Wallace, Mike Oliver, Mike McLaughlin, Rich Burgess*, Shawna Robinson*
|-
|1990
|Joe Nemechek|Bobby Moon, Ward Burton, Jack Sprague, Dana Patten, Davey Johnson, Dave Mader III, Ed Ferree, Frank Fleming, Clifford Allison*
|-
|1989
|Kenny Wallace
|Bobby Hamilton, Jeff Burton, Dave Rezendes, Robert Pressley, Brandon Baker, Dave Simpson, Ed Ferree*, Tom Harrington*
|}

^ Craven started seven races in 1991 (the limit was five) but was charged with only two starts.  The other five starts were in combination races with the Busch North Series, where he raced as a regular.  Both 1991 Busch Series wins were in combination races as a North driver.

Craftsman Truck Series
2023 ROTY Contenders
Rajah Caruth
Daniel Dye
Jake Garcia
Bret Holmes
Nick Sanchez

History

See also
Whelen Modified Tour (includes list of WMT RotY award winners)

ReferencesNotesCitations' NASCAR Chronicle by Greg Fielden & Consumer Guide''.

Awards established in 1954
Rookie of the Year